Hjort Massif is a salient mountain rising to about  at the northeast end of the Wilson Mountains, on the south side of Hilton Inlet, on the Bowman Coast of Graham Land, Antarctica. It was photographed from the air by the United States Antarctic Service, 1940, and was mapped by the United States Geological Survey from aerial photographs taken by the U.S. Navy, 1966–69. The massif was surveyed by the British Antarctic Survey, 1974–75, and was named by the UK Antarctic Place-Names Committee in 1977 after Johan Hjort, Professor of Marine Biology at the University of Oslo, 1920–39, and Chairman of the International Whaling Committee, 1926–39.

References

Mountains of Graham Land
Bowman Coast